Adnan Malik (born 5 October 1976) is a Pakistani cricketer. He played in 29 first-class and 31 List A matches between 1993 and 2010.

References

External links
 

1976 births
Living people
Pakistani cricketers
Karachi cricketers
Rawalpindi cricketers
Pakistan International Airlines cricketers
Sui Southern Gas Company cricketers
Cricketers from Karachi